A bullock cart or ox cart (sometimes called a bullock carriage when carrying people in particular) is a two-wheeled or four-wheeled vehicle pulled by oxen.  It is a means of transportation used since ancient times in many parts of the world. They are still used today where modern vehicles are too expensive or the infrastructure favor them.

Used especially for carrying goods, the bullock cart is pulled by one or several oxen. The cart is attached to an ox team by a special chain attached to yokes, but a rope may also be used for one or two animals. The driver and any other passengers sit on the front of the cart, while load is placed in the back. Traditionally, the cargo was usually agrarian goods and lumber.

History
The first indications for the use of a wagon (cart tracks, incisions, model wheels) are dated to around 4400 BC. The oldest wooden wheels usable for transport were found in southern Russia and dated to 3325 ± 125 BC. Evidence of wheeled vehicles appears from the mid 4th millennium BC between the North Sea and Mesopotamia. The earliest vehicles may have been ox carts.

Australia

 

In Australia, bullock carts were referred to as bullock drays, had four wheels, and were usually used to carry large loads. Drays were pulled by bullock teams which could consist of 20 or more animals. The driver of a bullock team was known as a 'bullocky'.

Bullock teams were used extensively to transport produce from rural areas to major towns and ports. Because of Australia's size, these journeys often covered large distances and could take many days and even weeks.

Costa Rica
In Costa Rica, ox carts (carretas in the Spanish language) were an important aspect of daily life and commerce, especially between 1850 and 1935, developing a unique construction and decoration tradition that is still being developed. Costa Rican parades and traditional celebrations are not complete without a traditional ox cart parade.

In 1988, the traditional ox cart was declared as National Symbol of Work by the Costa Rican government.

In 2005, the "Oxherding and Oxcart Traditions in Costa Rica" were included in UNESCO's Representative List of the Intangible Cultural Heritage of Humanity.

Indonesia

In Indonesia, bullock carts are used in the rural parts of the country for transporting goods and people, but more often in Indonesia are horsecars used rather than bullock carts. A bullock cart driver is known as, in Indonesian, a bajingan.

Malaysia
Bullock carts were widely used in Malaysia before the introduction of automobiles, and many are still used today.  These included passenger vehicles, now used especially for tourists. Passenger carts are usually equipped with awnings for protection against sun and rain, and are often gaily decorated.

North Korea
Bullock carts, called dalguji there, is still extensively used in North Korea because of fuel shortages. It is perhaps the last country where it is used for everyday transportation, both in agriculture and in military.

Gallery

See also

Bullock wagon
Bullocky, Australian term for the driver of a bullock team

References

Carts
Cattle
History of transport in India
Costa Rican culture